Admire Manyumwa (born 28 December 1987) is a Zimbabwean cricketer. He played the different formats of First-class cricket, List A cricket and T20 from 2006 to 2015.

References

External links
 

1987 births
Living people
Zimbabwean cricketers